Lirilumab (INN) is a human monoclonal antibody designed for the treatment of cancer. It binds to KIR2DL1/2L3.

This drug was developed by Innate Pharma and is licensed to Bristol-Myers Squibb.

Clinical trials
A phase 2 clinical trial for acute myeloid leukemia (AML) was terminated early ("failed") in 2017.

It was registered for a trial for squamous cell carcinoma of the head and neck (SCCHN), but it may be abandoned.

 nine clinical trials of lirilumab are registered as active.

References 

Bristol Myers Squibb
Monoclonal antibodies for tumors